Kemara Henare Hauiti-Parapara (born 5 March 1997) is a New Zealand rugby union player.

He was educated at Wellington College where he was a member of the 1st XV. He plays his club rugby for the Oyonnax rugby club

Hauiti-Parapara was a member of the New Zealand Schools team in 2015 and was also a part of the New Zealand Under-20s in 2017.

Transfer: 2022 transfer to Oyonnax in Rugby Pro D2 (second french league).

References 

Living people
Hurricanes (rugby union) players
1997 births
Rugby union scrum-halves
Wellington rugby union players
People educated at Wellington College (New Zealand)
Oyonnax Rugby players
Otago rugby union players
Highlanders (rugby union) players